Edward Fenton (died 1603) was an English navigator, son of Henry Fenton and Cicely Beaumont and brother of Sir Geoffrey Fenton. He was also a publisher of diaries and journals.

Biography

He was a native of Sturton-le-Steeple, Nottinghamshire. His mother belonged to a prominent Leicestershire family whose seat was at Coleorton Hall. In 1577 he sailed, in command of the Gabriel, with Sir Martin Frobisher's second expedition for the discovery of the Northwest Passage, and in the following year he took part as second in command in Frobisher's third expedition, his ship being the Judith.

He was then employed in Ireland for a time, but in 1582 he was put in charge of an expedition which was to sail round the Cape of Good Hope to the Moluccas and China, his instructions being to obtain any knowledge of the northwest passage that was possible without hindrance to his trade. For this voyage he was in charge of two warships, the Galleon Leicester and the Edward Bonaventure. On this unsuccessful voyage he got no farther than Portuguese Brazil, and although defeating a Spanish fleet just off São Vicente he was unable to trade with the Portuguese residents there. To add to his woes he was engaged in quarrelling with his officers, and especially with his lieutenant, William Hawkins, the nephew of Sir John Hawkins, whom he had in irons when he arrived back in the Thames. Richard Madox, who sailed as chaplain, kept a diary of the voyage for the whole year 1582 which has been published.

In 1588 he had command of the Mary Rose, (not the preserved vessel), one of the ships of the fleet that was formed to oppose the Spanish Armada. He died 15 years afterwards, and was buried in St Nicholas's Church in Deptford.

Personal life

Edward Fenton was married to Thomasina, daughter of Benjamin Gonson the Elder, and was brother-in-law to Sir John Hawkins, who married Katherine Gonson, Thomasina's sister. The mother of the girls, wife of Benjamin, was Ursula, daughter of Anthony Hussey.

Notes

References
 Elizabeth Story Donno, ed., An Elizabethan in 1582: The Diary of Richard Madox, Fellow of All Souls. Hakluyt Society/Cambridge University Press, 1976 
 E. R. G. Taylor, The Troublesome Voyage of Captain Edward Fenton 1582–83. Hakluyt Society/Cambridge University Press, 1959.

External links

English explorers
Year of birth unknown
1603 deaths
People of Elizabethan Ireland
People from Nottinghamshire
16th-century Royal Navy personnel
16th-century English writers